Beartown State Forest is a publicly owned forest with recreational features located in the towns of Great Barrington, Monterey, Lee, and Tyringham, Massachusetts. The state forest's more than  include  of recreational parkland. It is managed by the Massachusetts Department of Conservation and Recreation.

History
The forest was established with the state's purchase of 5000 acres in 1921. Forest roads were created by workers with the Civilian Conservation Corps beginning in 1933. Major CCC projects included the building of an earthen dam to create  Benedict Pond. The CCC camps were active here until 1940.

Flora and fauna
Wildlife include deer, bobcats, fishers, black bear, and beaver. Flora includes deciduous forests, various flowering shrubs and wildflowers. Two areas of old growth forest exist in the park.

Activities and amenities
The forest has trails for horseback riding, mountain biking, snowmobiling, snowshoeing, and all-terrain vehicle use. A  interpretive trail loops around Benedict Pond and a  stretch of the Appalachian Trail passes near the pond and across the forest. Swimming, fishing, and a ramp for non-motorized boating are offered on Benedict Pond. There are also facilities for camping, picnicking and restricted hunting as well as handicapped-accessible beaches and restrooms.

See also

List of old growth forests in Massachusetts

References

External links
Beartown State Forest Department of Conservation and Recreation
Beartown State Forest Map Department of Conservation and Recreation

Massachusetts state forests
State parks of Massachusetts
Parks in Berkshire County, Massachusetts
Campgrounds in Massachusetts
Civilian Conservation Corps in Massachusetts
Great Barrington, Massachusetts
Monterey, Massachusetts
Tyringham, Massachusetts
Lee, Massachusetts
1921 establishments in Massachusetts
Old-growth forests
Protected areas established in 1921